Leroy Frank Van Dyke (born October 4, 1929) is an American country music and honky-tonk singer and guitarist, best known for his hits "The Auctioneer" (1956) and "Walk on By" (1961).

Biography

Van Dyke was born in Mora, Missouri. He lived in Spencer, Wisconsin, and graduated from the University of Missouri majoring in agricultural journalism. He was catapulted into country music fame in 1956 with his composition "The Auctioneer", co-written with Buddy Black, which sold over 2.5 million records. He wrote the song about the life of his cousin, National Auctioneers Association Hall of Famer Ray Sims, also a Missourian. Van Dyke had the lead role of a budding country music performer in the 1967 movie What Am I Bid? in which Sims played himself as an auctioneer.

In his 50 years-plus career, Van Dyke has recorded more than 500 songs, dozens of them making the charts. His record of "Walk on By" (1961) was named by Billboard magazine in 1994 as the biggest country single of all time, based on sales, plays, and weeks in the charts. It stayed at number one in the U.S. country chart for 19 weeks, and in all, charted for 42 weeks, reaching number five on the pop listings. It sold more than 1.5 million copies.

Other Van Dyke hits were "If a Woman Answers", "Black Cloud", "Big Man in a Big House", "Anne of a Thousand Days", "Happy to Be Unhappy", "Night People", "Be a Good Girl", "Dim Dark Corner", "Five Steps Away", "How Long Must You Keep Me a Secret", "Afraid of a Heartache", "Big Wide Wonderful World of Country Music", "Birmingham", "Just a State of Mind", "Mr. Professor", "My World Is Caving In", "The Other Boys Are Talking", "Poor Guy", "Roses from a Stranger", "Texas Tea", "Who’s Gonna Run the Truck Stop in Tuba City When I’m Gone", "Wrong Side of the Tracks", "Your Daughter Cried All Night", "Your Money", and "The Life You Offered Me".

In the UK Singles Chart Van Dyke had two hits: "Walk on By" reached number five in February 1962, and "Big Man in a Big House" made number 34 in May that year.

He was a cast member in the late 1950s on Ozark Jubilee, and was co-host, with Bill Mack, of the Southern Baptist Radio/TV Commission-produced Country Crossroads radio show for 10 years, and was joined by a third co-host Jerry Clower. It became the most widely syndicated radio show in country music history.

Van Dyke continues a full performance schedule, traveling from his office/home complex on his 1,000-acre (4 km²) ranch in west-central Missouri near Sedalia, Missouri. He is a member of the National Auctioneers Association Hall of Fame, is active in many music industry organizations, and as a sideline, raises premium quality Arabian mules. All aspects of Leroy Van Dyke Enterprises are managed by his wife Gladys, a former legal secretary and court reporter. Their son Ben plays lead guitar in all Van Dyke performances. Leroy Van Dyke is also a Korean War veteran.

Discography

Albums

Singles

Awards
In 1967, Leroy Van Dyke was awarded the Founding President's Award (formerly Connie B. Gay Award) from the Country Music Association.

References

External links

[ Allmusic.com]
Dauphin, Chuck. Leroy Van Dyke Opens-Up on His Career, Doubters & the Road Ahead Billboard, February 16, 2015.

1929 births
Living people
People from Benton County, Missouri
American country singer-songwriters
Singer-songwriters from Missouri
American male singer-songwriters
Grand Ole Opry members
American people of Dutch descent
Members of the Country Music Association
Country musicians from Missouri
Dot Records artists
Mercury Records artists